Fulvio Ballabio (born 8 October 1954) is a race car driver born in Milan, Italy. He raced in Formula Two in 1983, in Formula 3000 in 1986 and 6 starts in CART from 1987 to 1989 for Dick Simon Racing and Dale Coyne Racing. More recently he drove in two races of the 2004 Formula X Sport Series.

In 1983 he started the Monte Carlo Automobile car manufacturer.

In 1989, he designed the "Montecarlo GTB Centenaire", a SuperCar, built of carbon fiber, the idea came from Lamborghini Countach Evoluzione (first car in the world made in carbon fiber completed in 1986). The engine, a V12 Biturbo with 720 horsepower, was modified by Carlo Chiti, who used to work for Alfa Romeo. The company, "Monte Carlo Automobile" was based in Fontvieille, Monaco. Originally the project was to make 100 supercars, but the project failed with only 5 cars made in the initial period, including the spider car named "Beau Rivage".

In 2005 he started as Montecarlo Automobile the collaboration with FIA/ACI/CSAI in the challenge of car powered by green energy from the street legal ALA 50 presented in 2008 powered by Methane and LPG and the Quadrifuel "Carlo Chiti" powered by Methane, Ethanol fuel, LPG and gasoline with which got the podium in the Methane class of FIA Alternative Energies Cup to the Montecarlo/BRC W 12 powered by LPG.

25 March 2012, Montecarlo/BRC competed in the 4 hours of international endurance race of Monza getting the eighth position among other car powered by gasoline like Ferrari 458, Lamborghini, Porsche, Chevrolet Corvette.

Racing record

Complete European Formula Two Championship results
(key) (Races in bold indicate pole position; races in italics indicate fastest lap)

Complete International Formula 3000 results
(key) (Races in bold indicate pole position; races in italics indicate fastest lap.)

Complete 24 Hours of Le Mans results

CART PPG Indy Car World Series
(key) (Races in bold indicate pole position)

See also

 :it:Montecarlo GTB Centenaire

Notes

External links

1954 births
Italian racing drivers
Champ Car drivers
Living people
European Formula Two Championship drivers
24 Hours of Le Mans drivers
International Formula 3000 drivers
World Sportscar Championship drivers
Italian automobile designers
Dale Coyne Racing drivers
Sauber Motorsport drivers